Luka Marić (born 25 April 1987) is a Croatian football player who plays for Concordia Chiajna.

Club career
Born in Pula, in his first professional season for Istra 1961 he collected 19 caps and scored once during the 2011-12 Prva HNL. In mid-2012 he moved to Rijeka. In November 2014 he moved to Zawisza Bydgoszcz. 

On 5 July 2015 Marić signed a one-year deal with Iranian club Persepolis. Maric played 20 games in the 2015–16 season for Persepolis and helped the team to a runners up finish in the Persian Gulf Pro League. At the end of the 2015–16 season the club attempted to renegotiate Marić's contract but they could not reach an agreement and he was released.

In 2018–2020, he was the player of the Ekstraklasa side Arka Gdynia. On 27 October 2020, he joined the Romanian Liga I club Argeș Pitești.

Career statistics

Honours

Club
HNK Rijeka
 1. HNL Runner-up: 2013–14
 Croatian Football Cup: 2013–14

Persepolis
 Iran Pro League Runner-up: 2015–16
Dinamo București
Cupa Ligii: 2016–17
Arka Gdynia
Polish SuperCup: 2018

References

External links

 
 

1987 births
Living people
Sportspeople from Pula
Croatian footballers
Association football central defenders
NK Rovinj players
NK Pomorac 1921 players
NK Istra 1961 players
HNK Rijeka players
Zawisza Bydgoszcz players
Persepolis F.C. players
FC Dinamo București players
Arka Gdynia players
FC Argeș Pitești players
FC Brașov (2021) players
CS Concordia Chiajna players
Croatian Football League players
Ekstraklasa players
Persian Gulf Pro League players
Liga I players
Liga II players
Croatian expatriate footballers
Expatriate footballers in Poland
Expatriate footballers in Iran
Expatriate footballers in Romania
Croatian expatriate sportspeople in Poland
Croatian expatriate sportspeople in Iran
Croatian expatriate sportspeople in Romania